Gaumont Palace may refer to a number of venues including:

 The Gaumont-Palace, a cinema in Paris open from 1907 to 1973
 The Hammersmith Apollo in London was known by this name from 1932 to 1962